François Vautier (sometimes written Vauthier), (born in 1589 in Arles; died on 4 July 1652 in Paris) was a French medical doctor and botanist.

Biography 
Vautier obtained his title of doctor in 1612 in Montpellier. He was Marie de' Medici's personal physician and close friend, which displeases Richelieu and lands him in prison. He was released after the cardinal's death in 1642.

First physician to the king 
He was appointed First Physician to King Louis XIV in 1646. He treated Monsieur, the only brother of Louis XIV, which earned him the abbey of Saint-Taurin d' Évreux. He was superintendent of the King's Garden and introduced the teaching of anatomy there.Vautier was one of the first to use cinchona bark.

References 

1589 births
1652 deaths
17th-century French physicians
17th-century French botanists